The  was a dual-purpose naval gun used by the Imperial Japanese Navy on the s as secondary armament in four triple turrets, the s in five triple turrets (later converted to five twin 20 cm/50 3rd Year Type naval gun turrets) and on the light cruiser Ōyodo in two triple turrets. The s were also initially planned to carry the 15.5 cm/60 3rd Year Type in five triple turrets, but were redesigned with the 20 cm/50 3rd Year Type in four twin turrets. They were also deployed on 60° single mounts as coastal defense guns in the Tokyo Bay area.  Construction was of the monobloc type with autofretting and used a Welin breech block mechanism which could be operated either hydraulically or by hand.  Their slow rate of fire, limited elevation and slow traverse made them unsuitable for the AA role, but they were an excellent anti-ship weapon.

See also
Canon de 155 mm Modèle 1920 French counterpart by caliber

Notes

References
 
Tony DiGiulian, Japanese 15.5 cm/60 (6.1") 3rd Year Type

External links

World War II naval weapons
Naval guns of Japan
155 mm artillery
Military equipment introduced in the 1930s